Pothyne longipennis is a species of beetle in the family Cerambycidae. It was described by Breuning and Itzinger in 1943.

References

longipennis
Beetles described in 1943